Pete Frank, also known as M. P. Frank III (August 20, 1930June 22, 2005) was a NASA engineer who served as the lead flight director for the Apollo 14 and Apollo 16 crewed lunar landing missions, as well as the American lead flight director for the Apollo-Soyuz Test Project.

Education
M. P. (Pete) Frank III was born in Bryan, Texas. His initials did not stand for anything and he was always known as "Pete". He graduated from Denton High School in 1948, and attended the University of Texas at Austin, receiving a bachelor's degree in aeronautical engineering by 1952.

Career
After college graduation, Frank joined the United States Marine Corps for four years as a pilot, then served in the Reserve, becoming a lieutenant colonel.

While working for the Glenn L. Martin Company in Baltimore, Maryland, Frank earned a master's degree in mechanical engineering at Drexel University in Philadelphia.

Frank joined NASA in 1962.

Frank was one of 44 men selected to report to Brooks Air Force Base for two months for extensive medical testing in January and February 1966 during the recruitment of what would become NASA Astronaut Group 5.  He was not chosen among those 19, but was a finalist.

In his January 1999 oral history, flight director Gene Kranz said, "Pete Frank translated the values 'discipline, morale, tough and competent now' into a statement … each controller has an opportunity to reflect as he approaches his role and responsibility in each mission."

Frank took the role of flight director in 1968.  He became the eighth director to lead a mission and adopted the team color orange, which was retired when he retired from NASA.  Frank, among others, directed Apollo 9, 10, and 12 and 17  Frank was lead director for Apollo 14 and 16. There were typically three to six flight directors per mission, with one serving as a lead director.

Frank served on the internal review board to study the causes of the Apollo 13 onboard explosion, under Dr. Edgar Cortright, Director of the Langley Research Center.

Frank, with other flight controllers and directors on Apollo 14, guided mission commander Alan Shepard, Lunar Module Pilot Edgar Mitchell and Command Module Pilot Stuart Roosa to the Moon on a redesigned Apollo command and service module, completing the mission planned for 13's crew to the Fra Mauro highlands. In 1975, Frank served as the American lead flight director for the Apollo-Soyuz Test Project. Frank would later become chief of the Flight Control Division before his retirement in 1983.

Post-career and death
Frank and his wife supported the Habitat for Humanity organization in fundraising and homebuilding.

Frank died after an auto accident, on June 22, 2005.

See also
Apollo program

Notes

1930 births
2005 deaths
NASA flight controllers
People from Bryan, Texas
Military personnel from Texas
University of Texas at Austin alumni